Frank Gamble (born 21 August 1961) is an English former footballer who played as a winger. He played for Derby County and Rochdale having signed for Derby from non league side Burscough in 1981.

References

1961 births
Living people
English footballers
Footballers from Liverpool
Association football forwards
Rochdale A.F.C. players
English Football League players